Republika Srpska Railways ( /  –  / ) is the railway company of Republika Srpska, Bosnia and Herzegovina. It is one of the two rail companies in the country (the other is the ŽFBH, operating in the Federation of Bosnia and Herzegovina). The company operates  of railroad.

History
The company was established around 1991 as Željeznice Srpske, from the bosnain elements of Yugoslav Railways. The company was renamed Željeznice Republike Srpske after the Dayton Accord formally formed Republika Srpska.

Organizational chart
Dragan Savanović (Director General)
Dragan Subašić (Exec. Dir. for Infrastructure)
Draženko Todorović (Exec. Dir. for Railway Operations)
Branislav Đurica (Executive Director for Economy Affairs)
Milenko Bilić (Exec. Dir. for Legal Affairs and Human Resources)

Rolling stock

Electrical Locomotives

Diesel Locomotives

Electric Multiple Unit

Diesel Multiple Unit

Wagons
ŽRS has made a contract for 200 wagons with Polish company EKK Wagon, which includes workshop equipment. The Wagons are designed to travel at 120 km/h with 22.5 ton axle loads. The order was signed with €20 Million of Polish credit.

Pictures

See also
 Željeznice Federacije Bosne i Hercegovine
 Rail transport in Bosnia and Herzegovina

References

External links

  ŽRS official website
 Rail map of Croatia, Slovenia and Bosnia-Herzegovina

Railway companies of Bosnia and Herzegovina
Government-owned railway companies
Companies based in Doboj
Railway companies established in 1992
1992 establishments in Bosnia and Herzegovina
Transport in Republika Srpska
Economy of Republika Srpska
Government-owned companies of Bosnia and Herzegovina